Águilas Fútbol Club is a Spanish football club based in Águilas, in the autonomous community of Murcia. Founded in 2010, the club plays in Segunda División RFEF – Group 5, holding home games at Estadio El Rubial, with a 4,000 seat capacity.

History
In 2010, Águilas Club de Fútbol was dissolved due to large debts. A few months later, Águilas CF fans founded Águilas FC and bought the place of CD Alquerías in the fifth division.

Season to season

1 season in Segunda División RFEF
10 seasons in Tercera División

Honours
 Preferente Autonómica
 Winners: 2010–11

 Tercera División
 Runners-up: 2011–12, 2015–16

References

External links
Official website 

Association football clubs established in 2010
Football clubs in the Region of Murcia
2010 establishments in Spain
Águilas FC